Limberg Gutiérrez Mojica (born 12 June 1998), is a Bolivian international footballer who plays as a midfielder for Club Deportivo Guabirá. He is the son of former Bolivian international footballer Limberg Gutiérrez.

International career
Gutiérrez Jr. made his international debut in a 1–0 away loss to Colombia in 2018 FIFA World Cup qualification, replacing Juan Aponte after 90 minutes.

Career statistics

Club

Notes

International

References

External links
 
 Profile at Nacional Official Website

1998 births
Living people
Sportspeople from Santa Cruz de la Sierra
Bolivian footballers
Bolivian expatriate footballers
Bolivia youth international footballers
Bolivia international footballers
Association football midfielders
Bolivian Primera División players
La Paz F.C. players
Club Nacional de Football players
Club Bolívar players
Guabirá players
Club Real Potosí players
Bolivian expatriate sportspeople in Uruguay
Expatriate footballers in Uruguay